Still Rockin' My Soul is an album by the Fairfield Four. It earned the group a Grammy Award for Best Roots Gospel Album.

Track list

References

2015 albums
Grammy Award for Best Roots Gospel Album